Cryptocephalus notatus is a species of case-bearing leaf beetles in the family Chrysomelidae. It is found in North America.

Subspecies
 Cryptocephalus notatus fulvipennis 
 Cryptocephalus notatus notatus 
 Cryptocephalus notatus sellatus Schaeffer, 1933

References

 Riley, Edward G., Shawn M. Clark, and Terry N. Seeno (2003). "Catalog of the leaf beetles of America north of Mexico (Coleoptera: Megalopodidae, Orsodacnidae and Chrysomelidae, excluding Bruchinae)". Coleopterists Society Special Publication no. 1, 290.

Further reading

 NCBI Taxonomy Browser, Cryptocephalus notatus
 Arnett, R.H. Jr., M. C. Thomas, P. E. Skelley and J. H. Frank. (eds.). (2002). American Beetles, Volume II: Polyphaga: Scarabaeoidea through Curculionoidea. CRC Press LLC, Boca Raton, FL.
 Arnett, Ross H. (2000). American Insects: A Handbook of the Insects of America North of Mexico. CRC Press.
 Richard E. White. (1983). Peterson Field Guides: Beetles. Houghton Mifflin Company.

notatus
Beetles described in 1787